The China Tribunal was a non-governmental tribunal to inquire into forced organ harvesting in China. It was headquartered in London.
The chair of the China Tribunal was Sir Geoffrey Nice KC, who had also been lead prosecutor at the trial of Slobodan Milošević in the International Criminal Tribunal for the Former Yugoslavia. Its other members were Professor of Paediatric Cardiothoracic Surgery at University College London Martin Elliott, Malaysian lawyer Andrew Khoo, Iranian lawyer, Shadi Sadr, US lawyer Ragina Paulose, businessman Nick Vetch and historian Arthur Waldron. All members of the Tribunal provided their time pro bono publico. The Judgment states: "All members of the Tribunal, Counsel to the Tribunal, volunteer lawyers and the editor of this Judgment have worked entirely pro bono publico (for the public good) which for those unfamiliar with the term or practice means completely without financial return of any kind."

The Tribunal was initiated by the International Coalition to End Transplant Abuse in China (ETAC).

Relationship with other groups and organizations 
The China Tribunal was initiated by the charity ETAC, of which "a minority of its committee members are Falun Gong practitioners". The Tribunal states that it itself is independent from ETAC, "none of the members of the Tribunal, Counsel to the Tribunal, the editor or the volunteer lawyers working with Counsel to the Tribunal is a Falun Gong practitioner or has any special interest in Falun Gong."

Events and history
In 2016, ETAC asked Geoffrey Nice to write an opinion about the issues that the tribunal was later to consider; Nice advised that a body of several people would be better able to consider the facts and law, which eventually led to ETAC forming the China Tribunal.

The China Tribunal held 5 days of public hearings in December 2018 and April 2019, in which over 50 fact witnesses, experts, and investigators testified.

On 17 June 2019, the China Tribunal pronounced its "final judgment" on organ harvesting in China, concluding that the Chinese Communist Party was, beyond reasonable doubt, guilty of committing crimes against humanity against China's Uyghur Muslim and Falun Gong populations, and that removing hearts and other organs from living victims constituted one of the worst mass atrocities of this century.

The China Tribunal Judgment stated: "In the long-term practice in the PRC of forced organ harvesting it was indeed Falun Gong practitioners who were used as a source – probably the principal source – of organs for forced organ harvesting." Adding that there was no evidence of the practice having been stopped and that the Tribunal was satisfied that it continued.

The judgment was published on 1 March 2020.

See also 
 Antireligious campaigns in China

References

External links
 

People's Tribunal
Justice
Organ trade
Organ transplantation
Human rights in China
21st-century human rights abuses
Scandals in China